Aspella senex is a species of sea snail, a marine gastropod mollusc in the family Muricidae, the murex snails or rock snails.

References

Gastropods described in 1903
Aspella